The Badlands Tour was the first headlining concert tour by American singer-songwriter Halsey, launched in support of her debut album, Badlands (2015). The tour began on September 30, 2015 at the House of Blues in San Diego, California, and concluded on September 18, 2016 at the Marina Bay Street Circuit in Singapore.

Set list
This setlist is a representative of the show at Madison Square Garden. It does not represent all dates of the tour.

 "Gasoline"
 "Hold Me Down"
 "Castle"
 "Haunting"
 "The Feeling"
 "Roman Holiday"
 "Drive"
 "Control"
 "Ghost"
 "Is There Somewhere"
 "Hurricane"
 "Coming Down"
 "Closer"
 "New Americana"
Encore
 "Colors Pt. II"
 "Colors"
 "Young God"

Shows

Cancelled shows

Notes

References

2015 concert tours
2016 concert tours
Halsey (singer) concert tours